Lesley Beake (born 1949) is a Scottish-born South African children's author.

Life
Lesley Beake was born and went to school in Edinburgh, Scotland. She lives in South Africa, where she has worked as a teacher. Her children's novels, "which address the plight of children of certain tribes in southern Africa, attract an adult audience".

Works
 Detained at Her Majesty's pleasure: the journal of Peter David Hadden, 1986
 The Strollers, 1987. Winner of the Percy FitzPatrick Award, 1986-1988, Winner of the Young African Award, 1987-1988
 A Cageful of Butterflies, 1989. Winner of the Percy FitzPatrick Award, 1988-9. Winner of the M-Net Book Prize, 1991.
 Rainbow, 1989
 Traveller, 1989
 Merino, 1989
 Serena's Story, 1990
 Tjojo and the wild horses, 1990
 Song of Be, 1991
 Bau and the baobab tree, 1992
 Mandi's wheels, 1992
 The Race, 1992
 Café Thunderball, 1993
 One dark, dark night, 1993
 Jakey, 1997
 An Introduction to Africa, 2000
 Home Now, 2006
 Remembering Green, 2009

References

  Yearwood, Emerging into Independence:The Self and the Culture in Lesley Beake's Song of Be, The Alan Review 24:3 (Spring 1997)

1949 births
Living people
South African women novelists
South African children's writers
South African women children's writers
British women children's writers
20th-century South African novelists
20th-century Scottish women writers
21st-century South African novelists
21st-century Scottish women writers
Writers from Edinburgh
Scottish emigrants to South Africa